Ila Lóth, born: Mária Rónai (28 May 1900 – 21 September 1975) was a Hungarian film actress. She appeared in 27 films between 1918 and 1973. She was born in Budapest, Hungary (Austria-Hungary) and died in Budapest. In 1923, she married Győző János Rohoczy Storer. Through her daughter Judit, she is grandmother of an actress Sunnyi Melles, Princess of Sayn-Wittgenstein-Sayn.

Selected filmography
 Az Élet királya (1917)
 Lili (1918)
 Küzdelem a létért (1918)
 Casanova (1918)
 Yamata (1919)
 Under the Mountains (1920)
 For Love and Crown (1922)

References

External links

1900 births
1975 deaths
Hungarian film actresses
Hungarian silent film actresses
20th-century Hungarian actresses